Bivange is a small town in the commune of Roeser, in southern Luxembourg. The town is known for as the birthplace of Luxembourg American photographer Edward Steichen.  , the town has a population of 594.

Roeser
Towns in Luxembourg